Ihor Tarasovych Hatala (born 18 June 1998) is a Ukrainian professional footballer who plays as a left winger for Ukrainian club Nyva Ternopil.

References

External links
 
 

1998 births
Living people
Ukrainian footballers
Association football forwards
FC Nyva Ternopil players
Ukrainian First League players
Ukrainian Second League players
Ukrainian Amateur Football Championship players
Sportspeople from Ternopil Oblast